In Greek mythology, Cercyon (Ancient Greek: Κερκύων, -ονος Kerkyon) was the name of the following two figures:

 Cercyon, malefactor who was killed by Theseus.
 Cercyon, son of Agamedes, and the father of Hippothous, who succeeded Agapenor as king of Arcadia when he did not return from Troy.

Notes

References 

 Pausanias, Description of Greece with an English Translation by W.H.S. Jones, Litt.D., and H.A. Ormerod, M.A., in 4 Volumes. Cambridge, MA, Harvard University Press; London, William Heinemann Ltd. 1918. . Online version at the Perseus Digital Library
Pausanias, Graeciae Descriptio. 3 vols. Leipzig, Teubner. 1903.  Greek text available at the Perseus Digital Library.

Theseus
Arcadian mythology